The 1916 Svenska Mästerskapet Final was played on 22 October 1916 between the sixth-time finalists AIK and the eight-time finalists Djurgårdens IF. The match decided the winner of 1916 Svenska Mästerskapet, the football cup to determine the Swedish champions. AIK won their fifth title with a 3–1 victory at Stockholm Olympic Stadium in Stockholm.

Route to the final

AIK 

AIK entered in the preliminary round and won, 7–1, against IFK Västerås at home in Stockholm on 13 August 1916. On 3 September 1916, AIK played the quarter-final against Helsingborgs IF at home and won, 7–3. In the semi-final on 24 September 1916, AIK won against IFK Göteborg at home, 2–1.

AIK made their sixth appearance in a Svenska Mästerskapet final, having won four and lost one.

Djurgårdens IF 

Djurgårdens IF entered in the preliminary round, where the team beat Hammarby IF, 7–1, at home in Stockholm on 10 August 1916. In the quarter-final, Djurgården won against IFK Norrköping, 2–1, at home on 3 September 1916. On 24 September 1916, Djurgården reached the final by winning an away-game semi-final against Örgryte IS with 2–0.

Djurgårdens IF were reigning champions by winning the previous final against Örgryte IS and made their eight appearance in a Svenska Mästerskapet final, having won two and lost five.

Match details

References 

Print

1916
AIK Fotboll matches
Djurgårdens IF Fotboll matches
Football in Stockholm
October 1916 sports events
Sports competitions in Stockholm
1910s in Stockholm